Bella is a feminine given name. It is a diminutive form of names ending in -bella. Bella is related to the Italian, Spanish, Greek, Portuguese and Latin words for beautiful, to the name Belle, meaning beautiful in French. It increased in usage following the publication of the Twilight books by Stephenie Meyer.  It is also known for being a nickname to Isabella, Annabella or Arabella.

Given name

People
 Bella A. Burnasheva (born 1944), Soviet/Russian astronomer
 Bella Abzug (1920–1998), American politician and prominent figure in the women’s movement
 Bella Agossou (born 1981), Beninese actress
 Bella Akhmadulina (1937–2010), Soviet/Russian poet, writer, and translator
 Bella Alarie (born 1998), American basketball player
 Bella Alten (1877–1962), Polish operatic soprano
 Bella Alubo (born 1993), Nigerian musician, singer, and songwriter
 Bella Andre, American author
 Bella Angara (born 1939), Filipina politician and former governor of Aurora province
 Bella Awa Gassama, Gambian actress
 Bella bat R. Jakob Perlhefter (c. 1650-1709/1710), Czech professional Hebrew letter writer, businesswoman, and music instructor
 Bella Bayliss (born 1977), Scottish triathlete
 Bella Bellow (1945–1973), Togolese singer
 Bella Bixby (born 1995), American soccer player
 Bella Blue (born 1982), American burlesque dancer and producer
 Bella Burge (1877–1962), American-born British actress, music hall performer, and boxing promoter
 Bella Clara Landauer (1874–1960), American collector and writer
 Bella Clara Ventura, Colombian-Mexican novelist and poet
 Bella Cortez (born 1944), Cuban actress and dancer
 Bella Darvi (1928–1971), Polish-born French actress
 Bella Davidovich (born 1928), Soviet-born American classical pianist
 Bella Dayne (born 1988), German actress
 Bella Disu (born 1986), Nigerian businesswoman
 Bella Dodd (1904–1969), American teacher, lawyer, labor union activist, and communist-turned anti-communist
 Bella Dorita (1901–2001), Spanish cabaret singer, dancer, and vedette
 Bella Duffy (1849–1926), Irish translator and writer
 Bella Emberg (1937–2018), English comedic actress
 Bella Feldman (born 1930), American sculptor
 Bella Ferraro (born 1994), Australian singer
 Bella Flores (1936–2013), Filipina film actress
 Bella Forsgrén (born 1992), Finnish politician
 Bella French Swisher (1837–1893), American author, editor, and litterateur
 Bella Freud (born 1961), London-based fashion designer
 Bella Fromm (1890–1972), German journalist and author of Jewish heritage
 Bella Galhos (born 1972), East Timorese former independence activist
 Bella Gesser (born 1985), Israeli chess player
 Bella Goodall (1851–1884), English soubrette of the Victorian theatre
 Bella Guerin (1858–1923), Australian feminist, women’s activist, women’s suffragist, anti-conscriptionist, political activist, and schoolteacher
 Bella Hadid (born 1996), American model
 Bella Hall Gauld (1878–1961), Canadian labour educator, political activist, and pianist
 Bella Hammond (1932–2020), American activist and commercial fisherman
 Bella Hardy, English folk musician, singer and songwriter
 Bella Heathcote (born 1987), Australian actress and model
 Bella Horwitz, Bohemian Yiddish writer and historian
 Bella Hristova (born 1985), Bulgarian-American violinist
 Bella Igla (born 1985), Israeli woman chess grandmaster
 Bella Jakubiak (born 1983), Australian chef
 Bella Jarrett (1926–2007), American stage, television, and film actress and novelist
 Bella Jimenez (born c. 1982), Ecuadorian politician
 Bella Joseph, American alleged to be a Soviet spy
 Bella Keyzer (1922–1992), Scottish weaver, welder, and shipyard worker
 Bella Kocharyan (born 1954), wife of Armenian former President Robert Kocharyan
 Bella La Rosa (born 1949), Venezuelan pageant titleholder
 Bella Lewitzky (1916–2004), American modern dance choreographer and teacher
 Bella Li (born 1983), Chinese-born Australian poet
 Bella MacCallum (1886–1927), New Zealand and British botanist and mycologist
 Bella Milo (born 1986), Samoan rugby union player
 Bella Myat Thiri Lwin (born 1999), Burmese actress, model, and beauty pageant title holder
 Bella Nagy (1879–1947), Hungarian actress
 Bella Nisan, Russian ophthalmologist
 Bella Ouellette (1886–1945), Canadian actress
 Bella Paalen (1881–1964), Austrian-American operatic soprano of Hungarian origin
 Bella Paige (born 2001), Australian singer
 Bella Paredes (born 2002), Ecuadorian weightlifter
 Bella Piero (born 1996), Brazilian actress
 Bella Poarch (born 1997), Filipino-American singer and social media personality
 Bella Ramsey (born 2003), English actress and singer
 Bella Ratchinskaia (born 1953), Russian ballerina, ballet teacher, and choreographer
 Bella Reay (1900–1979), English footballer
 Bella Rosenfeld (1895–1944), Belarusian writer, first wife of painter Marc Chagall
 Bella Santiago (born 1989), Filipino singer
 Bella Shaw, American journalist and news presenter
 Bella Shmurda (born 1997), Nigerian singer
 Bella Shteinbuk (born 1960), Israeli pianist and educator
 Bella Shumiatcher (1911–1990), Russian-Canadian-American pianist and music educator
 Bella Sidney Woolf (1877–1960), English author
 Bella Sims (born 2005), American swimmer
 Bella Smith (born 2001), Australian rules footballer
 Bella Spewack (1899–1990), Romanian-American writer, half of a husband-and-wife writing team
 Bella Starace Sainati (1878–1958), Italian stage and film actress
 Bella Subbotovskaya (1937–1982), Soviet mathematician
 Bella Taylor Smith, Australian singer
 Bella Thomasson (1874–1959), British bookmaker
 Bella Thorne (born 1997), American actress
 Bella Tovey (1926–2019), Polish Holocaust survivor
 Bella van der Spiegel-Hage (born 1948), Dutch former professional cyclist
 Bella Zilfa Spencer (1840–1867), English-born American novelist and editor

Fictional characters
 Bella the Bunny Fairy, from the Rainbow Magic book franchise
 Bella Cooper, from the New Zealand soap opera Shortland Street
 Bella Dawson, the protagonist of the Nickelodeon television series Bella and the Bulldogs
 Bella Goth, from The Sims series of video games
 Bella Lasagne, from Fireman Sam
 Bella Nixon, from the Australian television soap opera Home and Away
 Bella Pesky, the little sister of Maggie, Aldrin and Pupert Pesky in The Buzz on Maggie
 Bella Swan, the human protagonist of the Twilight series
 Bellatrix Lestrange, nicknamed Bella, a Death Eater and antagonist in the "Harry Potter" series

Surname
 Ahmed Ben Bella (1918–2012), third President of Algeria
 Angelica Bella (born 1968), Hungarian pornographic actress
 Eva Bella (born 2002), American voice actress
 Gianni Bella (born 1947), Italian composer and singer-songwriter
 Ivan Bella (born 1964), Slovak Air Force officer and cosmonaut
 Iván Bella (born 1989), Argentine footballer
 Ján Levoslav Bella (1843–1936), Slovak composer, conductor and music teacher
 Lauren Bella (born 2000), Australian rules footballer
 Marcella Bella (born 1952), Italian singer
 Martin Bella (born 1964), Australian rugby league footballer
 Michael Bella (born 1945), German footballer
 Rachael Bella (born 1984), American actress
 Stefano della Bella (1610–1664), Italian printmaker
 V.J. Bella (born 1927), member of the Louisiana House of Representatives
 The Bella Twins, a pair of American professional wrestlers and twin sisters:
 Brie Bella (born 1983), ring name of Brianna Danielson (née Garcia-Colace)
 Nikki Bella (born 1983), ring name of Nicole Garcia-Colace

References

Feminine given names
English feminine given names